The 12611 / 12 Puratchi Thalaivar Dr. M.G. Ramachandran Central Railway Station - Hazrat Nizamuddin Garib Rath Express is a Superfast Express train of the Garib Rath category belonging to Indian Railways - Southern Railway zone that runs between Puratchi Thalaivar Dr. M.G. Ramachandran Central Railway Station and Hazrat Nizamuddin (New Delhi) in India.

It operates as train number 12611 from Puratchi Thalaivar Dr. M.G. Ramachandran Central Railway Station to Hazrat Nizamuddin and as train number 12612 in the reverse direction serving the seven states of Tamil Nadu, Andhra Pradesh, Telangana, Maharashtra, Madhya Pradesh, Uttar Pradesh & Delhi. It shares the record of being the fastest train between Hazrat Nizamuddin and Puratchi Thalaivar Dr. M.G. Ramachandran Central Railway Station along with the Chennai Rajdhani Express covering the 2176 km journey in 28 hours and 20 minutes. Now, This train is on final stage to be replaced by Humsafar Express's AC 3-Tier Coaches but as per orders by High Court, this train runs with its existing ICF Garib Rath coaches and gives service to all passengers. But, Indian Railway said that only coaches of this Garib Rath will be replaced by Humsafar Express but fare will be same because of huge maintenance costs of ICF coach of this Garib Rath Express.

Coaches
The 12611 / 12 Puratchi Thalaivar Dr. M.G. Ramachandran Central Railway Station - Hazrat Nizamuddin Garib Rath Express has 14 AC 3 tier & 2 End on Generator coaches. It does not carry a Pantry car coach.

As is customary with most train services in India, Coach Composition may be amended at the discretion of Indian Railways depending on demand.

Services
The 12611 numbered Puratchi Thalaivar Dr. M.G. Ramachandran Central Railway Station - Hazrat Nizamuddin Garib Rath Express covers the distance of 2175 kilometres in 28 hours 10 mins (77.22 km/hr).

The 12612 numbered Hazrat Nizamuddin - Puratchi Thalaivar Dr. M.G. Ramachandran Central Railway Station Garib Rath Express covers the distance of 2176 kilometres in 28 hours 15 mins (77.03 km/hr).

As the average speed of the train is above , as per Indian Railways rules, its fare includes a Superfast surcharge.

Routes
The routes of 12611 / 12 numbered  Puratchi Thalaivar Dr. M.G. Ramachandran Central Railway Station - Hazrat Nizamuddin Garib Rath Express are:
 Puratchi Thalaivar Dr. M.G. Ramachandran Central Railway Station
 Gudur 
 Ongole 
 Vijayawada Junction 
 Nagpur
 Bhopal Junction 
 Jhansi Junction
 Agra Cantt 
 Hazrat Nizamuddin.

Traction

It is hauled by a Royapuram-based WAP 7 for its entire journey.

Coach Position

Timings

12611 Puratchi Thalaivar Dr. M.G. Ramachandran Central Railway Station - Hazrat Nizamuddin Garib Rath Express leaves Puratchi Thalaivar Dr. M.G. Ramachandran Central Railway Station every Saturday at 06:10 hrs IST and reaches Hazrat Nizamuddin at 10:20 hrs IST the next day.

12612 Hazrat Nizamuddin - Puratchi Thalaivar Dr. M.G. Ramachandran Central Railway Station Garib Rath Express leaves Hazrat Nizamuddin every Monday at 15:55 hrs IST and reaches Puratchi Thalaivar Dr. M. G. Ramachandran Central Railway Station at 20:15 hrs IST the next day.

References 

 https://web.archive.org/web/20140530062137/http://www.indianrail.gov.in/garibrath_trn_list.html
 https://www.youtube.com/watch?v=jWG7HHBGVM4
 https://www.flickr.com/photos/wap5holic/7353911698/
 http://www.tripadvisor.in/ShowTopic-g304551-i3482-k6498833-Side_Middle_in_Garib_Rath-New_Delhi_National_Capital_Territory_of_Delhi.html
 http://www.newindianexpress.com/states/tamil_nadu/article217202.ece

External links

Garib Rath Express trains
Rail transport in Tamil Nadu
Rail transport in Andhra Pradesh
Rail transport in Maharashtra
Rail transport in Madhya Pradesh
Rail transport in Uttar Pradesh
Rail transport in Delhi